Arthur Mannsbarth (born 28 April 1930) is an Austrian former road and track cyclist who competed in the 1952 Summer Olympics, and speed skater who competed in the 1952 Winter Olympics and in the 1956 Winter Olympics. He was born in Vienna.

Speed skating

In 1952 he finished eighth in the 5000 metres event, eleventh in the 10000 metres competition, 22nd in the 1500 metres contest, and 27th in the 500 metres event. Four years later he finished 28th in the 5000 meters competition, 29th in the 10000 meters contest, and 32nd in the 1500 meters event at the 1956 Games.

Cycling
At the 1952 Summer Olympics he competed in the road cycling race event but did not finish. As all three Austrian competitors did not finish the race, Austria was unplaced in the team road race contest. At the same Games he also finished 13th with the Austrian team in the team pursuit event.

References

External links
 

1930 births
Possibly living people
Austrian male speed skaters
Austrian male cyclists
Olympic speed skaters of Austria
Olympic cyclists of Austria
Speed skaters at the 1952 Winter Olympics
Speed skaters at the 1956 Winter Olympics
Cyclists at the 1952 Summer Olympics
20th-century Austrian people